Rip It Out, is an extended play album by American rock band thelastplaceyoulook. It was released on December 30, 2013 and produced by thelastplaceyoulook and Matt Novesky. The first single is "Rip it Out," and also features a rock cover of Miley Cyrus' Wrecking Ball.

Track listing
All songs written by thelastplaceyoulook
"Rip It Out" - 3:35	
"Sexytime" - 3:30
"Awake" - 3:46
"Quagmire" - 3:29	
"Ebb And Flow" - 4:00
"Wrecking Ball" (cover) - 3:47

Personnel

Band
Justin Nava – vocals
Kevin Pool – bass, vocals
Derek Young – guitar
Richard Sherwood – guitar
Mikey Garcia – drums
Andy Moths – drums (former member)

Production
thelastplaceyoulook – producers
Matt Novesky – producer
Paul Logus – mixing, mastering
Kevin Butler – engineering, mixing

References

Thelastplaceyoulook EPs
2013 EPs